Katrina or Katrine may refer to:

People
 Katrina (given name)
 Katrine (given name)
 Katrine (footballer), Brazilian footballer

Meteorology
List of storms named Katrina, a list of tropical cyclones designated as Katrina
 Hurricane Katrina, an exceptionally powerful Atlantic hurricane in 2005, and the costliest tropical cyclone in history

Places
 Katrine, Virginia, United States
 Lake Katrine, New York, United States
 Loch Katrine, a loch (lake) in Scotland

Music and entertainment
 Katrina and the Waves, a pop rock band of the 1980s 
 Katrina (1943 film), a Swedish film
 Katrina (1969 film), a South African drama film
 Katrina (novel), a 1936 Swedish novel by Sally Salminen
 Katrina (talk show), a 1967 Australian television talk show hosted by Katrina Pye that aired on ATV-0 in Melbourne
 Katrina, a webcomic from Red Giant Entertainment
 Katrine, best-selling 1909 novel by Elinor Macartney Lane

Other uses
 Katrina Cottage, a type of kit house
 Katrina cough, a respiratory illness
 , a United States Navy patrol vessel in commission from 1917 to 1919
 , a United States Navy transport vessel in commission from 1918 to 1919
 Katrine, a theoretical founding ancestor of human mitochondrial DNA Haplogroup K

See also
 Catherina